The Party of Conservative Accord was a conservative political party in the Czech Republic between 1998 and 2001. It was founded by a split of rightist wing of the Civic Democratic Alliance. Front figures of the party were Ivan Mašek, Čestmír Hofhanzl, Viktor Dobal, Zuzana Bönischová and Roman Joch. On 23 June 2001 party dissolved and merged into the Conservative Party.

References

1998 establishments in the Czech Republic
2001 disestablishments in the Czech Republic
Defunct conservative parties
Defunct political parties in the Czech Republic
Political parties disestablished in 2001
Political parties established in 1998